Aseem Pereira (born 24 August 1960) is a Brazilian artist. He migrated to Australia in 1990 where he studied Visual Arts at the Sydney College of the Arts.

Work
Pereira was a glass artist in his early years. His work was published twice in New Glass Review by the Corning Museum of Glass, and he was recipient of The Jaguar Designers of the Year (Glass category). His work has included weaving recycled materials.

Pereira's work has appeared in exhibitions and private collections in several countries.  He participated in juried exhibitions in the visual arts domain in Australia, namely 'Sculpture by the Sea' in 2001, the 'City of Hobart Art Prize' in 2007, the 'Wynne Prize' 2007, and the Helen Lempriere National Sculpture Award 2008.

References

External links

1960 births
20th-century Australian sculptors
Brazilian emigrants to Australia
Brazilian sculptors
Living people
University of Sydney alumni
21st-century Australian sculptors